The Limonese Authentic Party is a political party in Limón, Costa Rica. PAL was founded on 17 August 1976 by Marvin Wright Lindo, a radical trade union leader with links to groups such as Socialist Workers Organization and the Workers' Party. It became a notable force amongst the banana plantation workers at the Atlantic coast.

Wright is the president of the party. Delroy Carl Senior Grant is the General Secretary and Fredrick Patterson Bent is the treasurer. PAL works for economic autonomy for Limón.

In the 2016 local elections the party obtains the mayoralty of the municipality of Limón and 5 aldermen in the Limón Municipal Council.

It is currently contesting the 2018 general election for a seat in Limon's representation in the Legislative Assembly.

References

External links
Page about PAL by TSE

1976 establishments in Costa Rica
Agrarian parties in Costa Rica
Centrist parties in North America
Liberal parties in Costa Rica
Political parties in Costa Rica
Political parties established in 1976
Regionalist parties
Social liberal parties